Curtis Stigers is the eponymous debut album by American jazz musician Curtis Stigers, released on 24 September 1991 by Arista Records. It includes the hit singles "I Wonder Why", "You're All That Matters to Me", and "Never Saw a Miracle". The album peaked at number seven on the UK Albums Chart in 1992.

Track listing

Personnel
 Curtis Stigers – lead vocals, backing vocals (1, 3, 4, 5, 8, 9, 10), tenor saxophone (1, 7, 11), alto saxophone (2, 10)
 David Paich – keyboards (1, 4, 9, 11)
 Randy Kerber – keyboards (2, 3, 5-8), acoustic piano (2, 3, 5-8)
 Glen Ballard – additional keyboards (2, 3, 5, 6, 7, 10)
 Bill Payne – organ (2, 3, 5, 6, 7, 10)
 Danny Kortchmar – guitar (1, 4, 9)
 Michael Landau – guitar, guitar solo (5)
 Buzz Feiten – guitar (2, 3, 5, 6, 10)
 Basil Fung – guitar (2, 3, 5)
 Michael Thompson – guitar (2, 8)
 T. M. Stevens – bass (1, 4, 9, 11)
 Abraham Laboriel – bass (2, 3, 6, 7, 8, 10)
 Neil Stubenhaus – bass (5)
 Jeff Porcaro – drums (1, 4, 9, 11)
 John Robinson – drums (2, 3, 5, 6, 7, 10)
 Mike Baird – drums (8)
 Paulinho da Costa – percussion (3, 5, 6, 7, 10)
 Brandon Fields – saxophone (3)
 Kim Hutchcroft – saxophone (3)
 Gary Grant – trumpet (3)
 Jerry Hey – string arrangements (2, 3, 9, 11), trumpet (3), horn arrangements (3)
 Richard Altenbach, Reg Hill, Paula Hochhalter, Lisa Johnson, Roland Kato, Carole Kleister-Castillo, Rene Mandel, Ralph Morrison, Helen Nightingale and Frederick Seykora – strings (2, 3)
 Christine Ermacoff, Ronald Folsom, Carrie Holzman-Little, Lisa Johnson, Karen Jones, Roland Kato, Michael Markman, Ralph Morrison, Sheldon Sanov, Frederick Seykora, Margaret Wooten and Kenneth Yerks – strings (9, 11)
 Doug Dana – music chart preparation (1, 4, 9, 11)
 Orion Crawford – music chart preparation (2, 3, 5-8, 10)
 Angel Rogers – backing vocals (2, 3, 7, 10)
 Alfie Silas – backing vocals (2, 6, 7) 
 Tata Vega – backing vocals  (2, 3, 7, 10), 
 Siedah Garrett – backing vocals  (3, 10)
 Alexandria Brown – backing vocals (4, 9)
 Pattie Brooks – backing vocals (4, 9)
 Sally Taylor – backing vocals  (4, 9)
 Rose Banks – backing vocals (6)
 Andraé Crouch – backing vocals (6)
 Sandra Crouch – backing vocals (6)
 Geary Faggett – backing vocals (6)
 Jackie Gouche – backing vocals (6)
 Pattie Howard – backing vocals (6)
 Howard McCrary – backing vocals (6)
 Perry Morgan – backing vocals (6)

Production
 Tracks 2, 3, 5-8 & 10 arranged and produced by Glen Ballard; Recorded by Francis Buckley at Studio Ultimo (Los Angeles) with assistance from Barry Rudolph; Additional recording at The Village Recorder, Westlake Audio and Capitol Studios (all in Los Angeles); Engineering assistance by Rob Hart and Peter Doell; Mixed by Glen Ballard and Francis Buckley at Westlake Audio and Capitol Studios.
 Tracks 1, 4, 9 & 11 arranged and produced by Danny Kortchmar; Recorded by Rob Jacobs at Ocean Way Studios (Hollywood, CA) with assistance from Nick DiDia and Rail Jon Rogut; Mixed by Rob Jacobs and Nick DiDia at A&M Studios (Hollywood, CA) and The Village Recorder with assistance from Greg Goldman and Marty Brumbach.
 Mastered by Bernie Grundman at Bernie Grundman Mastering (Hollywood, CA).
 Technical Director for Tracking and Overdubs on Tracks 2, 3, 5-8 & 10 –Tom Biener
 Guitar Technician on Tracks 1, 4, 9 & 11 – Gavin Menzies
 Technical Advisor on Tracks 2, 3, 5-8 & 10 – Greg Loskorn
 Production Coordinator on Tracks 2, 3, 5-8 & 10 – Jolie Levine
 Art Direction and Design – Maude Gilman
 Art Coordinator – Amy Finkle
 Photography – Richard Corman
 Management – C. Winston Simone Management
 Business Management – Victor Wlodingeur for Wlodingeur, Erk & Chanzis, P. C. 
 Legal – Fred Davis; Levine, Thall & Plotkin

Charts

Weekly charts

Year-end charts

References

CD Liner Notes; "Curtis Stigers", 1991 Arista Records

1991 debut albums
Curtis Stigers albums
Arista Records albums
Albums produced by Glen Ballard
albums produced by Danny Kortchmar